Diocese of Bergen (Bjørgvin) may refer to the following ecclesiastical jurisdictions with episcopal see in Bergen (Bjørgvin), Norway:

 the pre-Reformation Catholic Ancient Diocese of Bergen (initially Selja)
 the contemporary Lutheran Lutheran Diocese of Bjørgvin